The Bendigo V/Line rail service is a regional passenger rail service operated by V/Line in Victoria, Australia. It serves passengers between state capital Melbourne, Victoria and the regional city of Bendigo, Victoria.

The Bendigo service is the third busiest regional rail service in Victoria (behind Geelong and Ballarat) carrying 2.59 million passengers in the 12 months ended 30 June 2017.

History 

The Melbourne, Mount Alexander and Murray River Railway Company built the line between Melbourne to Bendigo, finishing the fully double track line in 1862. Throughout the early twentieth century, many branch lines were built along the length of the Bendigo line, but by the time V/Line took over Victorian regional passenger services in 1983, the only passengers services still using the Bendigo line corridor were the Swan Hill and Bendigo intercity services. Eventually though, a twice weekly passenger service to Echuca from Melbourne and Bendigo was reinstated in 1996.

Under the Regional Fast Rail Project in 2006, the Bendigo line underwent major track upgrades that would allow for Velocity trains to run at speeds of 160km/h between Sunbury and Bendigo. However, between Kyneton and Bendigo the line was singled in order to allow for better clearance past heritage structures, although some double sections were retained in order to create long passing loops. The crossing loops were provided with bidirectional signalling, but only one track of the loop was upgraded for high-speed running.

With the Sunbury line's electrification project completed in 2012, Bendigo line trains no longer called at Diggers Rest. In 2014, Epsom station was  constructed to serve Bendigo's Northeastern suburbs, it was at first serviced four times daily by extending some services that terminated at Bendigo. On 27 June 2016, three more daily Bendigo V/Line services were also extended to the station of Eaglehawk, on the Swan Hill line.  The advent of the Bendigo Metro Rail Project has significantly increased the frequency of trains to Epsom, Eaglehawk as well as Kangaroo Flat stations.

On 16 July 2014, V/Line trains between Melbourne and Bendigo ceased stopping at North Melbourne Station as part of the Regional Rail Link project.

Over time, the service frequencies on both the Echuca and Swan Hill lines have increased up to two train services a day, with V/Line coach services also providing a relatively frequent service to these cities. 

In 2020, the Victorian Government announced a proposal to build the new Raywood, Goornong and Huntly railway stations as part of the Regional Rail Revival project.

Services 
Currently, V/Line runs at-least hourly passenger services along the Bendigo line, with additional frequency during peak hours. This frequency is normally inclusive of the trains that run from Swan Hill and Echuca via Bendigo to Melbourne. Additional peak hour services originate and terminate at Kyneton. Most trains terminate at Bendigo, but 7 weekday services continue onto Epsom, and a further 5 onto Eaglehawk. Service frequency between Kyneton and Bendigo is limited due to sections of single track. 

All passenger train services that terminate within Greater Bendigo (which includes Epsom and Eaglehawk) are run by VLocity DMUs, while some late night services to Bendigo are run by V/Line road coaches.

V/Line also operates twice-daily services to both the cities of Swan Hill and Echuca via Bendigo. These services are further supplemented by numerous V/Line road coach services which fill the gaps within the schedule. These services though tend to run as limited expresses in between Bendigo and Melbourne.

Infrastructure 
The line to Bendigo was fully double track prior to the Regional Fast Rail project in 2006. Now the line is double track until Kyneton, and is single-track with passing loops until Kangaroo Flat. The track is double between Kangaroo Flat and Bendigo, but single thereafter until Eaglehawk and Epsom.

Line guide

References

External links
www.vline.com.au
Official Timetable
Statistics and detailed schematic map at the vicsig enthusiast website

V/Line rail services
Transport in Bendigo
Transport in the City of Maribyrnong
Public transport routes in the City of Melbourne (LGA)
Transport in the City of Brimbank
Transport in the City of Hume